John and Donald Parkinson were a father-and-son architectural firm operating in the  Los Angeles  area in the early 20th century. They designed and built many of the city's iconic buildings, including Grand Central Market, the Memorial Coliseum and the City Hall.

John Parkinson

Early years
John Parkinson (12 December 1861 - 9 December 1935) was born in the small village of Scorton, in Lancashire, England in 1861. At the age of sixteen, he was apprenticed for six years to Jonas J. Bradshaw, an architect and engineer in nearby Bolton, where he learned craftsmanship and  practical construction. He attended night school at Bolton's Mechanics Institute to study architectural drafting and engineering. Upon completion of his apprenticeship at age 21, he immigrated to North America as an adventure; he built fences in Winnipeg and learned stair building in Minneapolis. He returned to England only to discover that the English construction trades demanded more time and service for advancement. He decided that his then capabilities would be more appropriate to the less-structured opportunities in America. Parkinson went to California, settling in Napa where he again worked as a stair-builder, and he took on architectural commissions in his spare time, designing some of his first commercial projects including an annex to the original Bank of Napa building (1888, Demolished).

Seattle practice

Considering Napa a "dead town", Parkinson ventured north to Seattle in February 1889, where he opened his first architectural practice after failing to secure a position as a draftsman. In March he entered a partnership with Cecil Evers, but this ended little more than a year later; Parkinson would leave Napa for good in September 1889 but would retain professional relationships with local mills to supply lumber and trim. Parkinson's early projects in Puget Sound included the Olympia Hotel, Olympia (1889;  destroyed), the Calkins Hotel, Mercer Island (1889; destroyed), and several residences. After the Great Seattle Fire of 6 June 1889, he secured several important business blocks, the Butler Block (1889–90; altered), and the Seattle National Bank Building, later called the Interurban Building (1890–92), an exemplary work of Romanesque Revival architecture.

In 1891, Parkinson won the design competition for the B.F. Day School (1891–92;  altered), located in the Fremont neighborhood of Seattle. Thereafter the Seattle School Board  appointed Parkinson as the Seattle Schools Architect and Superintendent. Parkinson was responsible for all Seattle Schools projects over the next several years, including the Pacific School (1892–93;  destroyed) and the Cascade School (1893–94; destroyed). He also designed the Seattle Seminary (1891–93)--the first building at Seattle Pacific University (now known as Alexander Hall);  and the Jesuit College and Church (1893–94; altered)--the first building at Seattle University (now known as the Garrand Building).

Parkinson frequently published renderings of his buildings in the professional architectural press. He was an early member of the Washington State Chapter of the American Institute of Architects (predecessor to today's AIA Seattle chapter).

Parkinson invested in real estate and he was both architect and developer of the Seattle Athletic Club Building (1893–94; destroyed). His investments left him financially vulnerable when the Panic of 1893, the severe national depression, curtailed construction after June 1893. Parkinson's schools position was terminated by the Seattle School Board early in 1894. In 1893 and 1894, he entered several competitions, but failed to win any commissions.

Parkinson firm in Los Angeles

Faced with no projects, nor prospects for work in Seattle, John Parkinson moved to Los Angeles in 1894 and opened his architecture office on Spring Street between Second and Third Streets. By 1896, Parkinson had designed the city's first Class "A" fireproof steel-frame structure: the Homer Laughlin Building at Third Street and Broadway. His 1901 Susana Machado Bernard House and Barn has been designated as a Historic Cultural Monument and listed in the National Register of Historic Places. His design for the 1904 Braly Block at Fourth Street and Spring became the first "skyscraper" built in Los Angeles. It held the distinction of being the tallest structure in town until the completion of City Hall in 1928.

In 1905, Parkinson formed a partnership with G. Edwin Bergstrom which lasted for ten years. Parkinson and Bergstrom became the dominant architectural firm for major structures in Los Angeles. Bergstrom left to establish his own successful practice in 1915.

Parkinson & Parkinson

John Parkinson was joined in 1920 by his son, Donald B. Parkinson (1895—1945).

Parkinson & Parkinson designed many of Los Angeles' finest buildings, which became some of the city's most enduring landmarks. Found on the impressive roster are: the Campus Master Plan and several noted buildings of the University of Southern California (1919–39), the Los Angeles Memorial Coliseum (1923 and 1930–31), Los Angeles City Hall (1928, with Albert C. Martin/structural and John C. Austin/working drawings), Bullocks Wilshire (1929) and Union Station (1939). John Parkinson completed an important early renovation of Pershing Square in downtown Los Angeles. Their work was also part of the architecture event in the art competition at the 1932 Summer Olympics.

Parkinson firm evolution
1888–1889	John Parkinson, Architect (Napa, California and Seattle, Washington)
1889–1890	John Parkinson and Cecil Evers, Architects (Seattle, Washington)
1890–1894	John Parkinson, Architect (Seattle, Washington)
1894–1895	Burton and Parkinson, Architects (Los Angeles, California)
1895–1905	John Parkinson, Architect (Los Angeles, California)
1905–1915	John Parkinson and G. Edwin Bergstrom, Architects (Los Angeles, California)
1915–1920	John Parkinson, Architect (Los Angeles, California)
1920–1945	John Parkinson and Donald B. Parkinson, Architects (Los Angeles, California)
1945–1955	Parkinson, Powelson, Briney, Bernard & Woodford, Architects (Los Angeles, California)
1955–1984	Woodford & Bernard, Architects (Los Angeles, California)
1984–1990	Woodford, Parkinson, Wynn & Partners, Architects (Los Angeles and San Diego, California)
1990–1992	DWL Parkinson Architects (Los Angeles and San Diego, California)
1992–2008        Parkinson Field Associates (Los Angeles, California and Austin, Texas)

Selected works
Seattle National Bank Building (Interurban Building), 102 Occidental Ave S, Pioneer Square, Seattle (Parkinson)
Alameda Square, the former terminal of the Southern Pacific Railroad in Downtown Los Angeles
Hotel Alexandria, part of the Spring Street Financial District, Los Angeles (John Parkinson)
A.G. Bartlett Building, 215 W 7th Street, part of the Spring Street Financial District, Los Angeles (Parkinson & Bergstrom)
Susana Machado Bernard House and Barn, 845 S. Lake St., Los Angeles (John Parkinson)
Blackstone's Department Store (later "The Famous", Broadway & 9th, Los Angeles (1917, John Parkinson)
Broadway Department Store (now the Junipero Serra State Office Building, 4th & Broadway, Los Angeles (1915, Parkinson & Bergstrom)
 Continental Building, 408 South Spring Street, part of the Spring Street Financial District, Los Angeles (John Parkinson)
 Bullock's Downtown flagship, 7th & Broadway, Los Angeles (1906-7, Parkinson & Bergstrom)
 Bullock's Westwood (first store), 1000 Westwood Blvd., Los Angeles (Parkinson & Parkinson)
Bullock's Wilshire Building, 3050 Wilshire Blvd., Los Angeles (John Parkinson)
 Burdick Block, NE corner 2nd & Spring, Los Angeles (John Parkinson, addition of top floors to original 1888 construction, 1900)
Caliente Railroad Depot, 100 Depot Ave., Caliente, NV (Parkinson & Parkinson)
Crocker Bank, 453 S. Spring Street, part of the Spring Street Financial District, Los Angeles (Parkinson & Bergstrom)
Engine House No. 18, 2616 S. Hobart Blvd., Los Angeles (John Parkinson)
Federal Reserve Bank of San Francisco, 409 W. Olympic Blvd. Los Angeles (Parkinson & Parkinson)
Geronimo Hotel, Tucson Arizona (John Parkinson)
Homer Laughlin Building (orig. as Coulter's department store, now Grand Central Market), 317 S. Broadway, Los Angeles (John B. Parkinson, 1896-8)
Jacoby Bros. department store, 331-3-5 S. Broadway, Los Angeles (John B. Parkinson, 1899-1900)
H. Jevne & Co. Building, southwest corner of 6th and Broadway, Los Angeles (1906-7, Parkinson & Bergstrom)
Los Angeles Memorial Coliseum, 3911 S. Figueroa St., Los Angeles (Parkinson & Parkinson)
Los Angeles City Hall, 200 North Spring Street, Los Angeles, California (Albert C. Martin & John Parkinson)
National Bank of Whittier Building, 13002 E. Philadelphia St., Whittier, CA (Parkinson & Parkinson)
Pomona station (California) 100 West Commercial Street, Pomona, CA  91768 (1940)
Saks Fifth Avenue, Beverly Hills, 9600 Wilshire Bd, Los Angeles (Parkinson & Parkinson) with Paul R. Williams.
Security Building, part of the Spring Street Financial District, Los Angeles
Rowan Building, 131 W. 5th Street, part of the Spring Street Financial District, Los Angeles (Parkinson & Bergstrom)
Security Trust and Savings, 6381-85 Hollywood Blvd. Hollywood, CA (Parkinson & Parkinson)
Southern California Gas Company Complex, 800, 810, 820 and 830 S. Flower St., Los Angeles (Parkinson & Parkinson)
Sterling Plaza in Beverly Hills, California
Title Guarantee and Trust Company Building, 401-411 W. 5th St., Los Angeles (Parkinson & Parkinson)
Title Insurance Building, 433 S. Spring Street, part of the Spring Street Financial District, Los Angeles (Parkinson & Parkinson)
Union Station (Los Angeles), 800 N. Alameda St., Los Angeles (Parkinson & Parkinson)
Union Station (Ogden, Utah), 25th St. at Wall Ave., Ogden, UT (Parkinson & Parkinson)
Washington Building, 3rd and Spring, Los Angeles (Parkinson & Bergstrom)
Zumberge Hall of Science, 3651 Trousdale Parkway, University of Southern California campus, Los Angeles (Parkinson & Parkinson)

References

 Ochsner, Jeffrey Karl, "John Parkinson" in Shaping Seattle Architecture:  A Historical Guide to the Architects (ed. Jeffrey Karl Ochsner), University of Washington Press, Seattle and London 1994, pages 28–32, 303, 
 Ochsner, Jeffrey Karl, and Andersen, Dennis Alan, Distant Corner: Seattle Architects and the Legacy of H. H. Richardson, University of Washington Press, Seattle and London 2003, pages 49–52, 175-79, 225-28, 249-54, 283-85, 310-14, .

External links
 An interview with Iconic Vision author Stephen Gee about John Parkinson's work on Notebook on Cities and Culture

 
Business duos
Defunct architecture firms based in California
American neoclassical architects
Art Deco architects
Historicist architects
American railway architects
Spanish Colonial Revival architects

Architects from Los Angeles
English emigrants to the United States
Architects from Seattle
20th-century American architects
Architects from Lancashire
Olympic competitors in art competitions